The GAA Hurling All-Ireland Senior Championship, known simply as the All-Ireland Championship, is an annual inter-county hurling competition organised by the Gaelic Athletic Association (GAA). It is the highest inter-county hurling competition in Ireland, and has been contested every year except one since 1887.

The final, currently held on the third Sunday in August, is the culmination of a series of games played during July and August, with the winning team receiving the Liam MacCarthy Cup. For the majority of its existence, the All-Ireland Championship has been played on a straight knockout basis whereby once a team loses they are eliminated from the championship. In more recent years, the qualification procedures for the championship have changed several times. Currently, qualification is limited to teams competing in three feeder competitions; the bulk of the teams involved make up the tier one Leinster Championship and the Munster Championship while two teams also qualify to the preliminary rounds from the second tier Joe McDonagh Cup. Annual promotion and relegation allows teams outside these competitions (teams from the Christy Ring Cup (tier 3), the Nicky Rackard Cup (tier 4) and the Lory Meagher Cup (tier 5)) to eventually reach the All-Ireland championship.

Twelve teams currently participate in the All-Ireland Championship, with the most successful teams coming from the provinces of Leinster and Munster. Kilkenny, Cork and Tipperary are considered "the big three" of hurling. They have won 94 championships between them.

The title has been won by 13 different teams, 10 of whom have won the title more than once. The all-time record-holders are Kilkenny, who have won the championship on 36 occasions. Limerick are the current champions, and have won the last three championships.

The All-Ireland Senior Hurling Championship final was listed in second place by CNN in its "10 sporting events you have to see live", after the Olympic Games.

History

Creation
Following the foundation of the Gaelic Athletic Association in 1884, new rules for Gaelic football and hurling were drawn up and published in the United Irishman newspaper. In 1886, county committees began to be established, with several counties affiliating over the next few years. The GAA ran its inaugural All-Ireland Senior Hurling Championship in 1887. The decision to establish that first championship was influenced by several factors. Firstly, inter-club contests in 1885 and 1886 were wildly popular and began to draw huge crowds. Clubs started to travel across the country to play against each other and these matches generated intense interest as the newspapers began to speculate which teams might be considered the best in the country. Secondly, although the number of clubs was growing, many were slow to affiliate to the Association, leaving it short of money. Establishing a central championship held the prospect of enticing GAA clubs to process their affiliations, just as the establishment of the FA Cup had done much in the 1870s to promote the development of the Football Association in England. The championships were open to all affiliated clubs who would first compete in county-based competitions, to be run by local county committees. The winners of each county championship would then proceed to represent that county in the All-Ireland series.

Beginnings
The inaugural All-Ireland Championship used, for the only time in its history, an open draw format without the provincial series of games. All of the existing county boards were eligible to enter a team, however, only six chose to do so. Disputes in Cork and Limerick over which club should represent the county resulted in neither county fielding a team. Dublin later withdrew from the championship. In all five teams participated: Clare (Garraunboy Smith O'Briens), Galway (Meelick), Kilkenny (Tullaroan) Tipperary (Thurles) and Wexford (Castlebridge).

Galway and Wexford contested the very first championship match on Saturday 2 July 1887. Postponements, disqualifications, objections, withdrawals and walkovers were regular occurrences during the initial years of the championship. The inaugural All-Ireland final took place on 1 April 1888 in Birr, County Offaly, with Tipperary defeating Galway to take the title.

Development
The provincial championships were introduced in 1888 in Munster, Leinster, Connacht and Ulster on a knock-out basis. The winners of the provincial finals participated in the All-Ireland semi-finals. Over time the Leinster and Munster teams grew to become the superpowers of the game, as Gaelic football was the more dominant sport in Ulster and Connacht. After some time Galway became the only credible team in Connacht and was essentially given an automatic pass to the All-Ireland semi-final every year. This knock-out system persisted for over 100 years and was considered to be the fairest system as the All-Ireland champions would always be the only undefeated team of the year.

Unlike in other European countries, such as neighbouring England, where annual sports events were cancelled during the twentieth century due to the First and Second World Wars, the All-Ireland Championship has been running continuously since 1887, with the final running since 1889 (the 1888 competition was played but no final was held due to the Invasion). The competition continued even in spite of the effects on the country of the Civil War and the Second World War (the National Hurling League was not held during the latter). In 1941, the All-Ireland Championship was disrupted by an outbreak of foot-and-mouth disease.

The duration of certain championship matches increased from 60 to 80 minutes during the 1970s. They were settled at 70 minutes after five seasons of this in 1975. This applied only to the provincial finals, All-Ireland semi-finals and finals.

In the mid-1990s the Gaelic Athletic Association looked at developing a new system whereby a defeat in the championship for certain teams would not mean an immediate exit from the Championship. In the 1997 championship the first major change in format arrived when the 'back-door system' was introduced. This new structure allowed the defeated Munster and Leinster finalists another chance to regain a place in the All-Ireland semi-finals. Tipperary and Kilkenny were the first two teams to benefit from the new system when they defeated Down and Galway respectively in the quarter-finals. The All-Ireland final in the first year of this new experiment was a replay of the Munster final with Clare defeating Tipperary. The first team to win the All-Ireland through the 'back-door' was Offaly in 1998, winning a replay of the Leinster final by beating Kilkenny 2–16 to 1–13.

The new "back-door system" proved successful and was expanded over the following years. The 2005 Championship saw even bigger changes in the "back-door" or qualifier system. The Munster and Leinster champions and defeated finalists automatically qualified for the new quarter-final stages, while two groups of four other teams played in a league format to fill the vacant four places in the quarter-finals. Many criticised the structure for not being a real championship at all, for degrading the Munster and Leinster championships and for penalising the strongest teams.

2008 brought a change to the competition format, whereby the team that won the Leinster and Munster championships advanced to the All-Ireland semi-finals, and the losers of the provincial finals advanced to two quarter-finals. A series of knockout qualifiers for the remaining teams decided which other two teams would reach the quarter-finals. The updated qualifier structure provided more games and gave renewed hope to the "weaker" teams, as a defeat in the first round no longer meant the end of a county's All-Ireland ambitions.

Since 2018, the All-Ireland SHC final is held on the third Sunday in August.

Current format

Current championship pyramid
Teams from the first two levels are eligible for the All-Ireland series in that year. Teams from tiers 3 to 5 may reach tiers 1 and 2 through promotion.

Championship
There are twelve teams in the All-Ireland Championship. During the course of a championship season (from July to August) seven games are played comprising two preliminary quarter-finals, two quarter-finals, two semi-finals and a final. The championship is played as a single-elimination tournament.

Qualification and progression (2022)

Teams

All-Ireland Senior Hurling Championship appearances
The three main ways to qualify for the All-Ireland Senior Hurling Championship are through

 Provincial Championships: Previously, the Connacht, Leinster, Munster and Ulster champions qualified to the All-Ireland. Now the top 3 in Leinster and Munster qualify.
 All-Ireland Qualifiers (back door): Open for all teams knocked out of their provincial championships.
 Second Tier: Previously, the All-Ireland Senior B Hurling Championship champions qualified to the All-Ireland. Now the Joe McDonagh Cup finalists qualify.

As of 27 December 2022.

Teams never to have qualified for the All-Ireland

Non-Irish teams
London became the first overseas team to compete in the All-Ireland Championship in 1900. For four consecutive years they were given a bye to the All-Ireland final where they played the "home" champions in the final proper. They won their only All-Ireland title in 1901. London returned to the All-Ireland Championship on a number of occasions between 1969 and 1996.

In 1905 Lancashire and Glasgow entered the All-Ireland Championship at the quarter-final stage. Lancashire returned for one more championship campaign in 1913, whilst Glasgow returned for the 1910 and 1913 championships.

New York fielded a team in an expanded All-Ireland Championship in 1996.

Venues

Attendances
Stadium attendances are a significant source of regular income for the GAA and for the teams involved. For the 2017 championship, the average attendances for the five games was 56,565 with a total aggregate attendance figure of 282,826. The 2017 figure represented the highest combined total for an All-Ireland Championship since 2012, when 294,079 fans attended six games, including a final replay between Kilkenny and Galway. The highest all-time aggregate attendance for the championship was 332,387 in 2007 when eight games were played.

Quarter-finals
Croke Park was initially used as the venue for All-Ireland quarter-finals following their introduction in 1997. These games were usually played as a double-header. From 2008 until 2017 the quarter-finals were played at Semple Stadium in Thurles.

Semi-finals
The All-Ireland semi-finals have been played exclusively at Croke Park since 1977. Croke Park had been regularly used as a semi-final venue prior to this, however, a number of other stadiums around the country were also used. St Brendan's Park and St Cronan's Park were regularly used for semi-finals involving Kilkenny and Galway. Other regular semi-final venues included the Markets Field, Páirc Uí Chaoimh, St Ciarán's Park, the Cork Athletic Grounds and Cusack Park.

Final
Since 1910, Croke Park has been the regular venue for the All-Ireland final. Only on two occasions since then has the final been played outside of Croke Park. Construction of the Cusack Stand in 1937 meant that that year's final was played at the newly opened FitzGerald Stadium in Killarney. In 1984 the GAA celebrated its centenary by playing the All-Ireland final at Semple Stadium in Thurles.

In the years prior to 1910, the All-Ireland final was held in a variety of locations around the country, including Jones's Road as Croke Park was known before its dedication to Thomas Croke. The inaugural final in 1887 was played at Birr, before Dublin venues Clonturk Park, the Pond Field and the Phoenix Park were used in the early 1890s. Fraher Field hosted the final on three occasions, while the final was played at the newly opened Cork Athletic Grounds on two occasions.

Managers

Managers in the All-Ireland Championship are involved in the day-to-day running of the team, including the training, team selection, and sourcing of players from the club championships. Their influence varies from county-to-county and is related to the individual county boards. From 2018, all inter-county head coaches must be Award 2 qualified. The manager is assisted by a team of two or three selectors and an extensive backroom team consisting of various coaches. Prior to the development of the concept of a manager in the 1970s, teams were usually managed by a team of selectors with one member acting as chairman.

Trophy and medals
At the end of the All-Ireland final, the winning team is presented with a trophy. The Liam MacCarthy Cup is held by the winning team until the following year's final. Traditionally, the presentation is made at a special rostrum in the Ard Chomairle section of the Hogan Stand where GAA and political dignitaries and special guests view the match.

The cup is decorated with ribbons in the colours of the winning team. During the game the cup actually has both teams' sets of ribbons attached and the runners-up ribbons are removed before the presentation. The winning captain accepts the cup on behalf of his team before giving a short speech. Individual members of the winning team then have an opportunity to come to the rostrum to lift the cup.

The Liam MacCarthy Cup commemorates the memory of Liam MacCarthy. Born in London to Irish parents in 1851, he was prominently involved in the establishment of a county board in London in the 1890s. In 1922 he presented the GAA with £500 to commission a cup for the All-Ireland champions. The cup, which was constructed to look like a medieval Irish drinking vessel called a mather, was made by jeweller Edmund Johnson at his premises on Dublin's Grafton Street. It replaced the Great Southern Cup as the All-Ireland trophy and was first presented to Bob McConkey of Limerick in 1923.

Declan Carr of Tipperary was the last recipient of the original Liam MacCarthy Cup in 1991 before it was retired. It is now on display in the GAA Museum in Croke Park. JMK Gold & Silversmith's produced an exact replica which was first awarded to Liam Fennelly of Kilkenny in 1992.

In accordance with GAA rules, the Central Council awards up to twenty-six gold medals to the winners of the All-Ireland final. The medals are 9 carat gold and depict the design of the GAA. Trophies are awarded to the All-Ireland runners-up. A miniature replica of the Liam MacCarthy Cup is awarded to the captain of the winning team.

Sponsorship
Since 1995, the All-Ireland Championship has been sponsored. The sponsor has usually been able to determine the championship's sponsorship name.

Media coverage
From the early 1920s, British Pathé recorded newsreel footage of the All-Ireland finals which was later shown in cinemas around the country. The National Film Institute and Gael Linn later produced their own newsreels of All-Ireland finals with Michael O'Hehir providing commentary. These newsreels were staples for cinema-goers until the 1960s.

Following the establishment of 2RN, Ireland's first radio broadcasting station, on 1 January 1926, sports coverage, albeit infrequent, was a feature of the schedules. Early broadcasts consisted of team announcements and short reports on events of interest. 2RN recorded a broadcasting first on 29 August 1926, when former hurler and journalist P.D. Mehigan carried a live commentary of the All-Ireland semi-final between Kilkenny and Galway. It was the first live radio broadcast of a field game outside of the United States. Although there was no designated sports department within Irish radio for many years, a two-way relationship between the national broadcaster and the GAA was quickly established. As well as exclusive live commentaries, Seán Ó Ceallacháin began broadcasting a weekly results programme on Radio Éireann in 1930.

When Telefís Éireann was established on 31 December 1961, the new station was interested in the broadcasting of championship games. The GAA, however, were wary that live television coverage would result in lower attendances at games. Because of this, the association restricted annual coverage of its games to the All-Ireland hurling and football finals, the two All-Ireland football semi-finals and the two Railway Cup finals. The first live broadcast of a hurling championship match was the All-Ireland final between Tipperary and Wexford on 2 September 1962. While the All-Ireland semi-finals were reintroduced in 1969, RTÉ was still confined to just broadcasting the final. In spite of this, highlights of the semi-finals were regularly shown.

The All-Ireland final between Tipperary and Kilkenny on 5 September 1971 was the first to be broadcast in colour.

The first All-Ireland semi-final to be broadcast live was the meeting of Cork and Galway on 7 August 1977. The popularity of the evening highlights programme led to the development of The Sunday Game, which was first broadcast on 8 July 1979. For the early years financial and logistical reasons restricted the programme to featuring just one full championship game and discussion about it. The show, however, soon expanded featuring coverage of one or more of the day's main championship games, followed by extended highlights of the other major games of the day.

The 1981 All-Ireland final between Offaly and Galway was simultaneously broadcast on RTÉ 1 and RTÉ 2, with Ger Canning providing commentary in the Irish language on the secondary channel.

In 1983, Channel 4 began broadcasting RTÉ's coverage of the All-Ireland final in Britain. This simulcast lasted until 1992 when the live broadcast was dropped; however, the entire match was shown at a later time.

In 2014, the GAA signed a three-year broadcasting deal with Sky Sports. While Sky were granted exclusive rights to some high-profile games, they were also permitted to broadcast live coverage of the All-Ireland semi-finals and final, however, these games were also broadcast live on RTÉ.

List of Finals

Roll of honour

The following counties have never won an All-Ireland in hurling:

General statistics 

Kilkenny are the most successful hurling county to date, having won the All-Ireland Hurling Championship the most times (36). Kilkenny have also been runners-up more often than any other team (28).

Only two teams have won the Championship on four consecutive occasions — Cork (1941–44) and Kilkenny (2006–09).

Only four teams have won the Championship on three consecutive occasions - Cork (1892–94, 1941–44 (4 times), 1952–54 & 1976–78), Tipperary (1898–1900, 1949–51), Kilkenny (1911–13, 2006–09 (4 times)) and Limerick (2020-2022).

Additionally, Galway (1987–1988) and Wexford (1955-1956) have both won back-to-back titles.

Antrim hold the unfortunate record of appearing in two All-Ireland Finals (1943 and 1989) without ever winning the cup.

Player records

Scoring records

In 1971 Eddie Keher of Kilkenny broke his own record of 14 points from the 1963 final by capturing 2–11 against Tipperary (although his team lost). This record was broken by Nicky English of Tipperary in 1989 when he scored 2–12 against Antrim. Keher's tally of 6–45 in the 1972 championship is also a record.

The official hurling records owned and published by Croke Park, and authenticated by the county historians of participating counties, note three records. (This information comes from p. 40 of official programme published the GAA on the day of 2005 final between Cork and Galway).

(1)  The 80 minute final. This 80 minute final took place in 1971 between Tipperary and Kilkenny. Eddie Keher scored 2-11 which makes a total of 17 points. However 2-8 of this was scored from frees. (2) The record for all 70 minute finals. This record was made in 1989. This hurling final was between Tipperary and Antrim. Nicholas English scored 2-12 points which equals a total of 18 points. However 0-9 of this was achieved from frees. (3) The 60 minute final: The overall scoring record is held by Michael Gah Ahern the greatest sharpshooter of the 1920s and early 1930s. He scored 5–4. What makes this scoring record remarkable is that he scored all of his scores from his hands.

Nicky Rackard of Wexford got the highest total in a championship game. In Wexford's 12−17 to 2–3 defeat of Antrim in the 1954 semi-final, he scored a remarkable 7-7.

Prior to the 1930s, scoring records for championship games were rarely kept. A number of players have been credited with enormous tallies. Andy 'Dooric' Buckley scored at least 6 goals when Cork beat Kilkenny by 8–9 to 0–8 in the 1903 All-Ireland 'home' final. Other newspaper reports credit him with 7 goals and 4 points.

P. J. Riordan is alleged to have scored all but 1 point of Tipperary's total when they beat Kilkenny by 6–8 to 0−1 in the 1895 All-Ireland final.

Jimmy Kelly of Kilkenny is said to have scored 7 goals in 30 minutes against Cork in the replay of the 1905 final.

In 1990 the rule prohibiting a hand-passed score was introduced. This had a large bearing on scoring, with fewer goals being scored in open play.

Championship Tiers

2023 Teams

Defunct championships
 All-Ireland Senior B Hurling Championship
 All-Ireland Intermediate Hurling Championship
 All-Ireland Junior Hurling Championship
 Connacht Senior Hurling Championship
 Ulster Senior Hurling Championship

See also
 All-Ireland Senior Football Championship
 All-Ireland Senior Club Hurling Championship
 Munster Senior Hurling Championship
 Leinster Senior Hurling Championship
 Ulster Senior Hurling Championship
 Connacht Senior Hurling Championship
 List of Gaelic games competitions

References

External links

 All-Ireland Senior Hurling Championship at the Gaelic Athletic Association

 
1887 establishments in Ireland
All-Ireland inter-county hurling championships
Recurring sporting events established in 1887